Chris Omprakash Sharma (born 23 April, 1981) is an American rock climber who is considered one of the greatest and most influential climbers in the history of the sport.  He dominated sport climbing for the decade after his 2001 ascent of Realization/Biographie, the world's first-ever redpoint of a consensus  graded route, and ushered in what was called a "technical evolution" in the sport. Sharma carried the mantle of "world's strongest sport climber" from Wolfgang Gullich (who held it for almost a decade from the early 1980s), and passed it to Adam Ondra (who held it from 2012). 

In 2008, Sharma redpointed the world's first-ever consensus  route with Jumbo Love, and in 2013, became only the second-ever person to climb a  route with La Dura Dura. Sharma became one of the most commercially successful climbers in his sport, and was noted for his "King Lines" – being iconic routes that inspired him to spend the months and even years needed to climb them – some of which feature in the award-winning 2007 climbing film, King Lines.

Early life
Chris Omprakash Sharma was born and raised in Santa Cruz, California, the only child of Gita Jahn and Bob Sharma. His parents were devotees of the yogi Baba Hari Dass, and adopted the surname Sharma when they got married.  He went to Mount Madonna, and attended Soquel High School for a year. Sharma started rock climbing when he was 12 at the Pacific Edge Climbing Gym, and he described himself as "one of the first climbing-gym-generation kids".

Climbing career

1996–2002 (to Realization)
From the outset, Sharma was considered prodigy in the climbing world.  At age 14, he won the adult 1996 US Open Bouldering Nationals, and a year later aged 15, he freed Boone Speed's project Necessary Evil  in the Virgin River Gorge, the hardest sport climb in North America at the time. The following year, Sharma won silver at the biennial UIAA World Championships at Paris, and gold at the Kranj leg of the UIAA World Cup, both for lead climbing.  Still 16, he suffered a serious knee injury that sidelined him for over a year. Aged 18, Sharma moved to Bishop, California, and began a US bouldering revolution with his 1999 film Rampage, and in February 2000, completed the first ascent of The Mandala, a world-famous boulder problem.

On 18 July 2001, aged 19, Sharma completed the extension of the  route Biographie in Ceüse in France, and named it Realization; the route was the first consensus  in the world, and has since become an important route in the history of sport climbing, with Climbing magazine noting that "technical rock climbing jumped in its evolution". It was the first confirmed increase in grades since Wolfgang Gullich's ascent of Action Directe , a decade earlier.  Sharma's ascent of the route was captured in Josh Lowell's 2002 film, Dosage Volume 1.  Days later, Sharma won the Munich leg of the IFSC World Cup in bouldering, only to be disqualified on testing positive for marijuana.

2002–2008 (to Jumbo Love)

After Realization, Sharma considered quitting climbing and went on Buddhist pilgrimages. However, a trip to Mallorca, Spain to meet Miquel Riera, a pioneer of deep-water soloing, led him to "fall in love with climbing all over again". Sharma largely abandoned competitions, to focus on "King Lines", a term he adopted for iconic routes that motivated him.  In 2004, Sharma solved the boulder problem Practice of the Wild , and in 2005 solved the dramatic roof of Witness the Fitness , followed by redpointing Dreamcatcher , regarded as one of North America's most iconic sport climbs. In 2006, he made an early repeat of La Rambla , and in 2007, after 50 attempts, stuck the crux dyno of Es Pontas in Mallorca, the world's first-ever  DWS route. Some of Sharma's climbs from this era are in the iconic and award-winning 2007 climbing film, King Lines.

In 2007, Sharma moved to Lleida, a town near the Spanish Pyrenees, in Catalonia, Spain, and over the next five years, created an unprecedented series of new  to  sport climbs, predominantly in Catalonian limestone crags (namely Oliana, Siurana, Santa Linya and Margalef), starting with the  classic of Papichulo  in May 2008.  In September 2008, Sharma made a trip back to the United States and climbed the world's first-ever consensus  route when he freed Randy Leavitt's  bolted route, Jumbo Love in Clark Mountain in California.

2008–2013 (to La Dura Dura) 
Sharma said that after climbing Jumbo Love, he needed to change his approach.  His previous breakthroughs had been on routes established and bolted by other climbers who had given up on them, and now he needed to find his own limit saying: "I wanted to push myself to the next level. Where is that? I had to discover it. That was a big process in itself. So I bolted all these routes [in Spain]. And a lot of them ended up being that next level". The period saw Sharma bolt and free numerous new extreme -graded "King Lines", including  (2008), Neanderthal (2009), and First Round First Minute (2011), each a major project in itself and since regarded as important classics, with Sharma saying "That's the thing about being on the cutting edge. You have to invent it". 

In 2011, Sharma invited the then 19-year-old climbing prodigy Adam Ondra, to try an Oliana route he had bolted in 2009 called La Dura Dura, which Sharma himself had given up on saying "I never saw myself being able to climb it.", and "I figured it would be for the next generation". For the next year, the two climbers worked the route in a collaborative process that saw Ondra make the first ascent in February 2013, and Sharma make the first repeat in March 2013. National Geographic called their collaboration a defining moment in the sport of rock climbing, when the title of "world's best climber" had begun to pass from one generation to the next.  Both Ondra and Sharma declared the collaboration to be a very positive experience with Sharma saying post his March ascent: "It was a healthy process for both of us, we fed off each other's motivation and through him, I think I became a better climber myself". Their collaboration was documented in Reel Rock 7 (2012), and La Dura Complete (2013).

Post 2013

One of Sharma's last known projects was a potential  route in Oliana beside La Dura Dura called Le Blonde, named in memory of Patrick Edlinger; it remains unfinished.

Legacy
Sharma is widely considered one of the greatest and most important rock climbers in the history of the sport. Sharma took on the title of "world's strongest sport climber" in 2001 from Wolfgang Gullich (who dominated in the decade from the early 1980s to the early 1990s), and passed it on to Adam Ondra (who dominated after 2012). In 2003, the LA Times called him the "greatest natural rock climber in the world".    In 2007, Melissa Block on NPR's All Things Considered, introduced him saying "Chris Sharma is hailed as the world's best rock climber, a pioneer who has mastered some of the most spectacular and difficult routes in the history of the sport".   In 2016, Outside said "Sharma shaped modern rock climbing. Whatever he thought was cool, we followed. Bouldering. Projecting hard sport routes. Deep water soloing.  In 2022, Climbing said: "The pioneering American sport climber is among the best to ever tie in, and was arguably the world's strongest rock climber for almost 20 years".

Sharma is noted for a "humble softly-spoken meditative disposition" (who often leaves it to others to grade his routes) coupled with a "highly aggressive and dynamic" climbing style. In 2016, Climbing said: "Over the past three decades, Sharma has cultivated a mellow Southern California persona, but in reality, he's one of the most competitive, focused, and driven athletes out there". His demeanor has been ascribed to his Buddhist raising; the LA Times called him "the Karma Climber".  He has credited Zen meditation techniques with helping him on routes, or when seeking direction and motivation.  Sharma was also known for eschewing any gym-based training (including fingerboards or cross-training) or dieting, preferring to climb as his sole method of training.

Sharma is credited with developing the commercial potential of extreme sport climbing, with Climbing saying "Not only did Sharma have the guns to become the first human to climb 5.15, he had the genius to see the potential, coupled with the commitment to spend months and years of his life proving it", and calling Sharma "arguably the highest-paid pro climber in the world". Outside added, "Before Sharma figured out how to balance elite performance with making a living, "professional climber" was an oxymoron.  Sharma's commercial appeal, and becoming one of the most filmed climbers, was attributed to his focus on "King Lines", which Sharma described as: "It's not enough to do something hard; it needs to be in an amazing position, a route that asks you to pour your heart and soul into climbing it".

Personal life
Sharma is the founder of the rock climbing gym Sender One, headquartered in Santa Ana, California, which he opened in 2013 as a business partnership with Walltopia, who was a sponsor of Sharma. In 2015, he opened a second gym, Sharma Climbing BCN, in Barcelona in Spain, and in 2021 he opened a third gym, Sharma Climbing Gava, on the outskirts of Barcelona.

Sharma was in a long-term public relationship with the Spanish professional climber , and they lived together in Oliana.  In August 2015, he married Venezuelan model and television personality Jimena Alarcón, and the couple moved from Oliana to Barcelona.  Their first child, a daughter named Alana, was born in June 2016, and their second child, a son, in 2019.

Zen

Sharma's parents were practising Zen Buddhists (although they did not live in at the Mount Madonna ashram) and for long periods Sharma has followed Zen routines (including daily 5.45am temple meditation).  Sharma has been on various Asian pilgrimages lasting several months, including the Shikoku Pilgrimage in Japan that he undertook after climbing Realization in 2001. 

The 2010 book Climbing: Because It's There (Philosophy for Everyone) discussed the impact of Zen Buddhism on Sharma saying: "Sharma's affinity for Buddhism, and Zen in particular, is well documented in film and print.  He exemplifies the spirit of Zen, being humble (but potent), ordinary (but extraordinary), self-aware, and most of all, authentic".

Sharma has however rejected the label of "spiritual climber", saying in 2011: "To be stereotyped like that definitely detracts from me personally. Like I said, I'm totally happy talking about this stuff. I just don’t want to make some image for myself like I’m some sort of saint or something. I get frustrated, and I get bummed out".  Sharma is no longer a practicing Zen Buddhist, and said in 2022: "Climbing is fully engaging… it’s an easy way to access that [meditative] state of mind… easier than sitting down and meditating".

Notable ascents

Redpointed routes 
:
 La Dura Dura – Oliana (ESP) – 23 March, 2013. Sharma developed and bolted the route, and made first repeat after Adam Ondra's February 2013 first ascent.

 (5.15b/c):
 El Bon Combat – Cova de l'Ocell (ESP) – 7 March, 2015. First ascent; described by Sharma as a "King Line", now considered closer to 5.15b, but a classic.

:
 Jumbo Love – Clark Mountain (USA) – 11 September, 2008. First ascent, and world's first-ever  route. Repeated by Ethan Pringle (2015), and Jonathan Siegrist (2018).
  – Siurana (ESP) – 17 December, 2008. First ascent, and the first-ever  to be repeated when Adam Ondra climbed it in March 2010 (Ondra's first-ever 9b).
 Neanderthal – Santa Linya (ESP) – 18 December, 2009. First ascent. Second ascent by Jakob Schubert (2018), and third, after almost a decade of attempts, by Adam Ondra (2019).
 First Round First Minute – Margalef (ESP) – 19 April, 2011. First ascent. First repeat by Adam Ondra (2014), second by Alex Megos (2016), and third by Stefano Ghisolfi (2017).
 Fight or Flight – Oliana (ESP) – 5 May, 2011. First ascent. First repeat by Adam Ondra (2013); the "first 9b" for many others (Jakob Schubert (2015), Sachi Amma (2015), Matty Hong (2018)).
 Stoking the Fire – Santa Linya (ESP) – 6 February 2013. First ascent. First repeat by Adam Ondra (2016), and like Fight or Flight, a popular 9b route.

:

 Realization – Céüse (FRA) – 18 July, 2001. First ascent and the world's first-ever consensus  route; features in Dosage Volume 1.
 Papichulo – Oliana (ESP) – 31 May, 2008. First ascent. First repeat by Adam Ondra (2009), and has since become one of the most repeated and popular 9a+ routes.
 Demencia Senil – Margalef (ESP) – 20 February, 2009. First ascent. First repeated by Iker Pou (2010), and second repeat by Ramón Julián Puigblanqué (2010).
 Pachamama – Oliana (ESP) – 29 May, 2009. First ascent. First repeated by Sachi Amma (2011), and then by Ramón Julián Puigblanqué (2015), and Adam Ondra (2017).
 First Ley – Margalef (ESP) – 28 February, 2010. First ascent. Shorter 15m route that avoids the 9b finish of First Round First Minute; popular "first 9a+" with several repeats.
 Power Inverter – Oliana (ESP) – December, 2010. First Ascent. First repeated by Ramón Julián Puigblanqué (2014), and then by Sachi Amma (2015).
 Catxasa – Santa Linya (ESP) – 14 January, 2011. First Ascent. First repeated by Ramón Julián Puigblanqué (2012); numerous repeats. 
 La Rambla – Siurana (ESP) – 1 December, 2006. Third ascent (just a day after the second ascent), and made Scharma the first climber to have climbed multiple confirmed  routes.

:

 Dreamcatcher – Squamish, British Columbia (CDN) – September, 2005. First ascent. Bolted with Sonnie Trotter, since considered one of the most iconic climbs in North America.
 Three Degrees of Separation – Céüse (FRA) – July, 2007. First ascent. Right of Realization and uses 3 large dynos; the first repeat was by Adam Ondra (2015), who felt it was a 9a+.
 Era Vella – Margalef (ESP) – March, 2010. First ascent. Sharma did it warming up and called a "soft 9a"; it became a popular "first 9a", but the grade is now considered 8c+/9a.
 Samfaina – Margalef (ESP) – June, 2010. First ascent.  Sharma felt it was 9a, but Jorge Diaz-Rullo and Alex Megos suggest 9a+.

:

 Necessary Evil – Virgin River Gorge (USA) – 1997. First ascent. Sharma, aged 15, freed Boone Speed's project to create North America's hardest route at the time.

Onsighted routes 
:

 French Gangster – Yangshuo (CHN) – April, 2009. Hardest route in China at the time (renamed from American Gangster).
 Humildes Pa' Casa – Oliana (ESP) – December, 2008.
 Divine Fury – Maple Canyon (USA) – September, 2008.
 T-Rex – Maple Canyon (USA) – September, 2008.
 Snuff Movies – Sant Llorenç del Munt (ESP) – May, 2015.
V for Vendatta – Siurana (ESP) – 1 April, 2022. Sharma was about to turn 41, and it was his sixth time onsighting 8c.

Deep-water solo routes 

:
 Alasha – Mallorca (ESP) – 16 September, 2016.  First ascent (named for his daughter Alana). Scharma felt it would be 9a with bolts, but as a DWS route was closer to 9b, the world's first-ever DWS at that grade.  First repeat by Jakob Schubert in 2021 who felt it was a 9a DWS route.

:
 Es Pontàs – Mallorca (ESP) – 26 September, 2007.  First ascent, and featured in the film King Lines.  World's first-ever DWS at 9a+, and considered one of the most spectacular in the sport. First repeat by Jernej Kruder (2016), then Jan Hojer (2018) and Jakob Schubert (2021).

Boulder problems 

:
 Practice of the Wild – Magic Wood, (CHE) – August, 2004. First ascent. First repeat by Tyler Landman, then Daniel Woods; possible .
 Witness the Fitness – Ozarks (USA) – March, 2005. First ascent of  roof and filmed in Dosage 3. Repeated by Fred Nicole and Daniel Woods, but unclimbable after hold broke.
 Catalan Witness the Fitness – Cova de l’Ocell (Barcelona, ESP) – January, 2016. First ascent. A tunnel-like, horizontal roof; possible .

:
 The Mandala – The Buttermilks (Bishop, USA) – February, 2000. First Ascent of an iconic boulder problem.

Bibliography
Why We Climb: The World's Most Inspiring Climbers (Chris Noble), 2017, Falcon Guides. pages 239–261 .

Filmography
 Sharma's 1999 bouldering tour of California: 
 Sharma's 2001 ascent of Realization: 
 Sharma's 2005 ascent of the roof of Witness the Fitness: 
 Sharma's 2005 ascent of Dreamcatcher: 
 Sharma's 2007 ascent of Es Pontas, and Three Degrees: 
 Ondra and Shama's 2012 attempts on La Dura Dura: 
 Ondra and Shama's 2013 ascents on La Dura Dura:

Competitions
 1995 Annual IFSC Climbing World Youth Championships (Lead, Youth B for age 14-15), Laval event. Gold Medal.
 1996 Annual U.S. Open Bouldering Nationals. Gold Medal. Sharma was aged 14 when he won the adult open competition.
 1997 Biennial UIAA Climbing World Championships (Lead), Paris event. Silver Medal. Sharma was aged 16.
 1997 UIAA World Cup (Lead), Kranj event. Gold Medal. Sharma was aged 16.
 1999 Summer X Games, San Francisco (Bouldering). Gold Medal. Sharma was aged 17.
 2000 Wasatch Open Bouldering Competition.
 2001 18th Annual Phoenix Bouldering Contest.
 2001 IFSC World Cup (Bouldering), Munich event. Gold Medal, but subsequently disqualified when testing positive for marijuana.

After 2001, Sharma largely abandoned most competitions, but did take part in various US events:
 2002 Ford Gorge Games
 2003 Earth Treks Roc Comp
 2004 Earth Treks Roc Comp
 2004 American Bouldering Series, third round of the 2003–04 Series (ABS5).
 2007 Mammut Bouldering Championships
 2008 Mammut Bouldering Championships
 2009 Ilerbloc Open Internacional
 2010 Earth Treks Roc Comp
 2010 Psicobloc Masters Series, Bilbao, Spain. The world's first DWS competition.

See also 
List of grade milestones in rock climbing
History of rock climbing
Josune Bereziartu, greatest female sport climber of the 1990s and 2000s
Wolfgang Güllich, greatest sport climber of the 1980s

Notes

References

External links

 
 

 Tenaya profile

1981 births
Living people
American rock climbers
Free soloists
IFSC Climbing World Championships medalists
Sportspeople from Santa Cruz, California
21st-century American people
Boulder climbers